The Réunion national football team is the regional team of the French overseas department and region of Réunion and is controlled by the Réunionese Football League, local branch of the French Football Federation. Réunion is not a member of FIFA and is only an associate member of CAF, and is therefore not eligible to enter either the World Cup or the Africa Cup of Nations. However, it has played numerous matches, most of them against the island nations of Madagascar, Mauritius, and the Seychelles.

History

Réunion's first international came in the 1947 Triangulaire, losing twice against Mauritius (2–1) and Madagascar (4–2). Réunion won their first match in the 1950 edition, beating Madagascar 3–2.

In the 1979 Indian Ocean Island Games, Réunion qualified top of their group, beating Seychelles (3–0) and Maldives (9–0). In the semi-finals, they beat Comoros (6–1), leading to a rematch against Seychelles in the final. Réunion won 2–1.

Réunion qualified for the final of the 1985 Indian Ocean Island Games, losing on penalties to Mauritius after a 4–4 draw. Réunion got out of the group stage again at the 1993 Games, beating Mauritius in the semi-finals 1–0 with Jimmy Moultanin scoring their only goal. They lost 1–0 to Madagascar in the final. They got their revenge against Madagascar in the 1998 final, drawing 3–3 in regular time before winning 7–6 on penalties.

Réunion made it to the final of the 2003 Indian Ocean Island Games losing to the hosts Mauritius 2–1. In the 2007 Games, Réunion won the competition despite scoring only two goals.

Réunion entered the inaugural 2008 Coupe de l'Outre-Mer, winning their group against Mayotte (6–1) and French Guiana (2–0), qualifying for the final, where they beat Martinique (1–0). They entered the 2010 Coupe de l'Outre-Mer, facing Martinique again in the final, losing on penalties.

Réunion advanced to the knock-out stages of the 2011 Indian Ocean Island Games, losing to Seychelles (2–1) in extra-time. They beat Mayotte 1–0 to claim third place. In the 2012 Coupe de l'Outre-Mer Réunion qualified for the final match, beating French Guiana (2–0), Saint Pierre and Miquelon (10–0) and Guadeloupe (2–1) before meeting Martinique for the third consequtive final, defeating them 10–9 on penalties. In the 2015 Games Réunion beat Mayotte 3–1 in the final and in the 2019 competition they beat Mauritius on penalties, with Mathieu Pélops saving all five attempts in the penalty shoot-out.

Current squad
The following 20 players were selected to the squad for the 2011 Indian Ocean Island Games:''' 

|-----
! colspan="9" bgcolor="#B0D3FB" align="left" |
|----- bgcolor="#DFEDFD"
|-

|-----
! colspan="9" bgcolor="#B0D3FB" align="left" |
|----- bgcolor="#DFEDFD"
|-

|-----
! colspan="9" bgcolor="#B0D3FB" align="left" |
|----- bgcolor="#DFEDFD"
|-

RecordsPlayers in bold are still active with Réunion.''

Most appearances

Top goalscorers

Competitive record

Indian Ocean Island Games

Coupe de l'Outre-Mer

Triangulaire

Head-to-head record
Last update: 7 May 2011  1–3

References

External links
 Réunion Island CAF Profile
  Official site Réunion Island Football Association

 
African national association football teams
National football teams of Overseas France
Football in Réunion